This is a list of villages in Sikar district, a district of Rajasthan state in northern India. Sikar is the administrative headquarters of the district.

A–D 

 Alakhpura Bogan
 Balaran
 Bathot
 Bau Dham
 Beri
 Bhoodha Ka Bas
 Bhopatpura
 Bhuma
 Bidasar
 Bidsar
 Birania
 Birodi Bari
 Birodi Chhoti
 Chandpura
 Churimiyan

D–H 

 Dantla
 Deorala
 Dhani Pujariyon Ki
 Fadanpura
 Ganeshwar
 Garinda
 Gothra Bhukaran
 Harsawa
 Harsh

J–L 

 Jeenmata
 Jhadhewa
 Karanga Chhota
 Katrathal
 Khatikan Pyau
 Khatushyamji
 Khinwasar
 Khood
 Khuri Bari
 Khuri Chhoti
 Kishor Pura
 Kudan
 Ladhana
 Lampua

M–P 

 Mandela Chhota
 Mandholi
 Mangloona
 Maonda
 Mirzwas
 Moondwara
 Mundru
 Nabipura
 Nangal Abhaypura
 Nangal Bhim
 Neemera
 Nethwa
 Nimakidhani
 Nimera
 Palthana
 Piprali
 Puran Badi

R–V 

 Ramjipura
 Ramshisar
 Roru
 Rosawa
 Salamsingh Ki Dhani
 Sankhu
 Sanwali
 Sewad Bari
 Sewad Chhoti
 Sujawas
 Sutot
 Tajsar
 Thikariya
 Tihawali
 Vijaipura
 Sihot Chhoti
 Sihot Badi

Sikar district